Orocrambus lectus is a moth in the family Crambidae. It was described by Alfred Philpott in 1929. It is endemic to New Zealand, where it has been recorded from Fiordland and north-western Nelson. The habitat of this species consists of subalpine and alpine areas. Adults have been recorded from December to February. Adults of this moth are known to pollinate Olearia virgata.

References

Crambinae
Moths described in 1929
Moths of New Zealand
Endemic fauna of New Zealand
Endemic moths of New Zealand